Who the Fuck Are Arctic Monkeys? is the second EP by English rock band Arctic Monkeys, released on 24 April 2006 by Domino Recording Company. This is the band's final record to feature Andy Nicholson on bass, as he left the band a month after the EP's release.

Background
"The View from the Afternoon" was expected to have been the band's third single, following UK number ones "I Bet You Look Good on the Dancefloor" and "When the Sun Goes Down", but the band announced in March 2006 that its next record would be a five-track EP, which thereby disqualified it from being listed in the UK Singles Chart and UK Albums Chart.

"Despair in the Departure Lounge" was premiered at a gig in the Great American Music Hall in San Francisco, although it was played by Alex Turner alone due to Andy Nicholson blowing his bass amplifier. This would also be the only time the band played the song live.

Although the contentious language content of the EP resulted in less radio airplay than the band's earlier releases, the nature of their rise to fame and their lack of reliance on radio meant that this was not a concern for the band.

Track listing

Personnel
 Alex Turner – lead vocals, lead and rhythm guitar
 Jamie Cook – rhythm and lead guitar, backing vocals
 Andy Nicholson – bass guitar, backing vocals
 Matt Helders – drums, backing vocals

Charts

Release history

References

Arctic Monkeys albums
2006 EPs
Domino Recording Company EPs